The Condor Trilogy (射鵰三部曲) is a series of three wuxia novels written by Hong Kong-based Chinese writer Jin Yong (Louis Cha).  The series is amongst the most popular of Jin Yong's works.

The novels in the trilogy are:
 The Legend of the Condor Heroes (射鵰英雄傳), published in 1957.
 The Return of the Condor Heroes (神鵰俠侶), published in 1959.
 The Heaven Sword and Dragon Saber (倚天屠龍記), published in 1961.

An English translation into 12 books is to be published by MacLehose Press beginning in February 2018.

Historical background 
The first novel, The Legend of the Condor Heroes, is set against a backdrop of a series of wars fought between the Han Chinese-dominated Southern Song dynasty and the Jurchen-led Jin dynasty. Concurrently, Mongol tribes led by Temüjin (Genghis Khan) emerge as a rising power in the north. The second novel, The Return of the Condor Heroes, is set in the period when the Mongols attack the Southern Song dynasty after having conquered the Jin dynasty. The historical Battle of Xiangyang is also featured as one of the key events in the novel. The third and last novel, The Heaven Sword and Dragon Saber, is set in the late Yuan dynasty (founded by the Mongols). Towards the end of the novel, the Yuan dynasty is overthrown by rebel forces and the Ming dynasty is established.

Plot

Book of Wumu 
The Book of Wumu is a fictional military treatise written by the Song general Yue Fei. The book is highly sought after by the Jurchens of the Jin dynasty. Guo Jing uses the knowledge he acquired from the book to defend the Song dynasty. Before his death, he hid the book in the blade of the Dragon Slaying Saber. Nearly a century after the Battle of Xiangyang, the book comes into Zhang Wuji's possession. Zhang uses one of the strategies in the book to defeat Yuan forces at the siege of Mount Song. He passes the book to Xu Da, who studies it and becomes a brilliant military leader. Xu Da leads rebel forces to overthrow the Yuan dynasty and becomes one of the founding pioneers of the Ming dynasty.

References

 
Literary trilogies
MacLehose Press books